The Missouri S&T Miners (variously S&T or Missouri Miners) are the athletic teams that represent the Missouri University of Science and Technology, located in Rolla, Missouri, in intercollegiate sports as a member of the Division II level of the National Collegiate Athletic Association (NCAA), primarily competing in the Great Lakes Valley Conference (GLVC) for most of its sports since the 2005–06 academic year; while its men's swimming team competes in the New South Intercollegiate Swim Conference (NSISC). The Miners and Lady Miners previously competed in the Mid-America Intercollegiate Athletics Association (MIAA) from 1935–36 to 2004–05; and in the Missouri College Athletic Union (MCAU) of the National Association of Intercollegiate Athletics (NAIA) from 1924–25 to 1932–33.

Overview
Until 1964, the school was known as the "Missouri School of Mines", and until 2008 it was the "University of Missouri—Rolla". The nickname "Miner", or a variation of it, is common at mining schools in many states. Missouri S&T's official school colors are silver and gold; the color green has historic relevance and is also used prominently.

Varsity sports
Missouri S&T competes in 17 intercollegiate varsity sports (10 for men, 7 for women): Men's sports include baseball, basketball, cross country, football, golf, soccer, swimming, track & field (indoor and outdoor) and volleyball; while women's sports include basketball, cross country, soccer, softball, track & field (indoor and outdoor), volleyball and spirit squad. Former sports included women's golf. As of July 2022, men's volleyball became the 17th varsity sport in the 2023 spring season (2022–23 school year).

Notes

Baseball 
The baseball team won the GLVC West division title in 2011, 2012 and 2016.
The baseball team also won a share of the GLVC regular season title in 2019, tying with Maryville University and Quincy University.

Conference affiliations:
 1935–2005: Mid-America Intercollegiate Athletics Association
 2006–present: Great Lakes Valley Conference

Head Coach: Todd DeGraffenreid (2004–present)
Home Field: S&T Ballpark
Uniform Colors: Black and Gold (inception–2007), Green and Gold (2008–present)
MIAA Titles: 1968, 1972
GLVC (West) Titles: 2011, 2012, 2016
GLVC (Regular Season) Titles: 2019

CoSIDA Academic All-Americans:
Jeff Mitchell: 1992
Eric Cummins: 2003
Steve Hopkins: 2004
Brandon Cogan: 2009, 2010
Andy Hall: 2012
Lee Voth-Gaeddert: 2012
Nick Ulrich: 2016

Missouri S&T baseball records are listed below.

Basketball

Men's 
The team made the GLVC tournament in 2010 for the first time since joining the conference.  The Miners also made the GLVC Tournament field in 2012, 2014 and 2017, and as a member of the MIAA, won the conference tournament in 1996.

Head Coach: Bill Walker (2019–present)
Assistant Coach: Darreon Reddick (2021–present)

Conference Championships:
MIAA: 1975–76, 1995–96

All-Americans:
Curtis Gibson: 1984–85
Duane Huddleston: 1987–88
Bill Jolly: 1992–93
Michael McClain: 1995–96

CoSIDA Academic All-Americans:
Russ Klie: 1977
Todd Wentz: 1984
David Moellenhoff: 1986
Brian Westre: 2002, 2003, 2004
Bryce Foster: 2014
Missouri S&T men's basketball records are listed below.

Women's 
The team shared the GLVC West division regular season title in 2011. It reached the championship game of the NCAA Great Lakes Regional in 2008, losing to eventual national champion Northern Kentucky, then made the NCAA Division II Midwest Regional in 2011.  The Miners have played in three NCAA Division II Tournaments, having also been in it in 1996 after winning a share of the MIAA regular season championship.

Head Coach: Kira Carter (2020–present)
Assistant Coach: Van Klohmann (2020–present)

CoSIDA Academic All-Americans:
Jennifer Cordes: 1990
Jamie Mertens: 1998
Missouri S&T women's basketball records are listed below.

Cross country

Men's 
Head Coach: Shaun Meinecke (2017–present)
Assistant Coach: Mary Duerbeck (2017–present)
Conference Championships:
MIAA: 1958

All-Americans:
Ben Mulvaney: 1996–97

CoSIDA Academic All-Americans:
Matt Hagen: 1999
Allen Ernst: 2010
Tyler Percy: 2016

Women's 
Head Coach: Shaun Meinecke (2017–present)
Assistant Coach: Mary Duerbeck (2017–present)

CoSIDA Academic All-Americans:
Kim Finke: 1996
Kate Hamera: 2003, 2004

Football 

Conference affiliations:
 1935–2005: Mid-America Intercollegiate Athletics Association
 2006–2011: Great Lakes Football Conference
 2012–present: Great Lakes Valley Conference

Head coach: Andy Ball (2022–present)
Home field: Allgood–Bailey Stadium
Uniform colors: Black and Gold (Inception–2007), Green and Gold (2008–present)

Conference championships: 9
 MIAA: 1941 (Co-Champions), 1947, 1949, 1950, 1956 (Co-Champions), 1977 (Co-Champions), 1980, 1983 (Co-Champions)
 GLFC: 2008

All-Americans:
Ed Kromka: 1941
Frank Winfield: 1969
Merle Dillow: 1974
Bill Grantham: 1980
Eivind Listerud: 1993
Cole Drussa: 2003, 2004
Ashton Gronewold: 2005, 2006, 2007
Joe Winters: 2006
Brian Crider, 2009
Eddie Rascon, 2012
Chris Emesih, 2013
Will Brown, 2014
Deshawn Jones, 2017
Bo Brooks: 2018
Roderick Chapman: 2018
Braxton Graham, 2018
Tyler Swart, 2018
Tershawn Wharton, 2018

CoSIDA Academic All-Americans:

Kim Colter: 1972
Paul Janke: 1980
Randy Hauser: 1982
Bob Pressly: 1982
Tom Reed: 1986
James Pfeiffer: 1987, 1988
Mark Diamond: 1991
Don Huff: 1991, 1992
Eivind Listerud: 1993
Brian Gilmore: 1994, 1995, 1996
Curt Kimmel: 2001, 2002
Cole Drussa: 2004
Phil Shin: 2005
Chad Shockley: 2010
Brian Peterson: 2012
Bret Curtis: 2016
Bo Brooks 2017, 2018
Landon Compton: 2017
Deshawn Jones: 2017, 2018, 2019
Payton McAlister: 2020
Kyle Urich: 2020, 2021
Zach Glaess: 2021

Missouri S&T football records since 1935 are listed below.  NOTE: The 2020 season was played in the spring of 2021.

Golf 
Head Coach: Chad Green (2016–present)

In fall 2017, the men's golf program returned to Missouri S&T (absent since 2003) and the Missouri S&T women's golf program was created.

At the end of the 2020–2021 academic year, S&T discontinued its women's golf program.

CoSIDA Academic All-Americans:
Brian Panka: 1996–97

Soccer

Men's 
Head Coach: Rob Cummings (2018–present)

CoSIDA Academic All-Americans:
Chris Shaw: 2003
Dan Gravlin: 2006
Trent Doerner: 2011
Ryan Muich: 2011
Caleb Collier: 2012
Adam Stensland: 2012
Timmy Kenny: 2013
Ryan Lawhead: 2014, 2015
David Murphy: 2017
Paal Benum: 2020–21

Missouri S&T men's soccer records are listed below.  NOTE: The 2020 season was played in the spring of 2021.

Women's 
Head Coach: Jane Grimley (2022–present)

CoSIDA Academic All-Americans:
Denise McMillan: 2001
Anna Fink: 2014, 2016

Missouri S&T women's soccer records are listed below.  NOTE: The 2020 season was played in the spring of 2021.

Softball 
Affiliations:
 1935–2005: Mid-America Intercollegiate Athletics Association
 2006–present: Great Lakes Valley Conference

Head Coach: Cathy Monroe (2015–present)
Home Field: Missouri S&T Softball Field

CoSIDA Academic All-Americans:
Jenny Crede: 1993
Christy Deken: 2004
Kandi Wieberg: 2007, 2008
Kaylea Smith: 2013

Missouri S&T softball records are listed below.

Swimming 
Head Coach: Daniel Murphy (2022–present)
National Finishes: 1998–2013

1997–1998: 3rd
1998–1999: 7th
1999–2000: 6th
2000–2001: 5th
2001–2002: 5th
2002–2003: 13th
2003–2004: 9th
2004–2005: 6th
2005–2006: 7th
2006–2007: 4th
2007–2008: 2nd
2008–2009: 3rd
2009–2010: 8th
2010–2011: 9th
2011–2012: 24th
2012–2013: 14th
2013–2014: 11th
2014–2015: 16th
2015–2016: 13th
2016–2017: 14th
2017–2018: 13th
2018–2019: 6th
2019–2020: 9th
2020–2021: 13th
2021–2022: 19th

Conference Championships: 1998–2013

1998–1999: Mideast Regional Champions
2000–2001: Central States Champions
2006–2007: New South Champions
2007–2008: New South Champions
2008–2009: New South Champions
2009–2010: New South Champions
2010–2011: New South Champions
2011–2012: New South Champions
2012–2013: New South Champions

CoSIDA Academic All-Americans:
Jack Pennuto: 2003, 2004
Bill Gaul: 2005, 2006, 2007
Andy Shelley: 2006, 2007
David Calcara: 2008
Mark Chamberlain: 2008
Andrew Schranck: 2013
Keith Sponsler: 2014, 2015, 2016
Miguel Chavez: 2016
Stuart Mossop: 2017, 2018
Tim Samuelsen: 2018, 2020

Track and field

Men's 
Head Coach: Shaun Meinecke (2017–present)
Assistant Coach: Mary Duerbeck (2017–present)
Conference Championships – Indoor:
MIAA: 1948
GLVC: 2009, 2020
Conference Championships – Outdoor:
GLVC: 2009, 2014, 2015, 2018, 2021, 2022

CoSIDA Academic All-Americans:
Matt Hagen: 1999
Jordan Henry: 2008, 2009
Allen Ernst: 2010
Dan Hellwig: 2012
Adriel Hawkins: 2014
Joe Vellella: 2014
Tyler Percy: 2016
Lucas Rosenbaum: 2018

Women's 
Head Coach: Shaun Meinecke (2017–present)
Assistant Coach: Mary Duerbeck (2017–present)

CoSIDA Academic All-Americans:
Kim Finke: 1996
Kate Hamera: 2003, 2004
Becca Kueny: 2006, 2007
Mary Ann Bradshaw: 2014
Taylor Cipicchio: 2014
Katlyn Meier: 2015

Volleyball

Women's 
Affiliations:
Great Lakes Valley Conference: 2007–present

Head Coach: Andy Halaz (2018–present)
Assistant Coach: Ryan Anderson
Home Court: Gale Bullman Multi-Purpose Building
Uniform colors: Black and Gold (2007), Green and Gold (2008–present)

Conference Championships:
GLVC: 2011 (West Division)
GLVC: 2012 (West Division)
GLVC: 2020–21 (West Division)

CoSIDA Academic All-Americans:
Jennifer Costello: 2011, 2012
Hayley Wright: 2013
Krista Haslag: 2015
Lauren Flowers: 2017

Missouri S&T women's volleyball records are listed below.  NOTE: The 2020 season was played in the spring of 2021.

Men's
Missouri S&T will begin men's volleyball play in the 2023 season (2022–23 school year). Unlike all other S&T teams, men's volleyball is a de facto Division I member. The NCAA's top-level national championship in that sport is open to both D-I and D-II members, and scholarship limits are identical in both divisions.

Head Coach: Andy Halaz (2023–present)
Assistant Coach: Ryan Anderson
Home Court: Gale Bullman Multi-Purpose Building
Uniform colors: Green and Gold (2023–present)

References

External links